TIRR Memorial Hermann (the four initials stand for "The Institute for Rehabilitation and Research") is a 134-bed rehabilitation hospital, rehabilitation and research center, outpatient medical clinic and network of outpatient rehabilitation centers in Houston, Texas that offers physical rehabilitation to patients following traumatic brain or spinal injury or to those suffering from neurologic illnesses.

TIRR Memorial Hermann's main campus offers inpatient rehabilitation in the Texas Medical Center in Houston, Texas. There are 5 outpatient rehabilitation locations in the greater Houston area, including Kirby Glen, Memorial City, Greater Heights, Sugar Land, and The Woodlands.

TIRR Memorial Hermann is a teaching hospital for Baylor College of Medicine and University of Texas Health Science Center at Houston.

History
TIRR Memorial Hermann traces its roots back to the early 1950s when polio was at the height of its epidemic in the United States. At the beginning of that decade, William A. Spencer, M.D., established one of the first polio treatment centers in the nation in Houston. The Southwestern Poliomyelitis Respiratory Center was dedicated to patient treatment and research and performed groundbreaking work.

Dr. Spencer was notably involved in developing the physiograph, a device recognized in the March 22, 1954 issue of Life magazine for its ability to record vital functions. This technology advanced teaching and research efforts and is credited as an early example of the sophisticated monitoring systems we use today.

In 1959, TIRR, opened its doors in the Texas Medical Center. With the discovery of the polio vaccine in the 1960s, the disease became less of a threat. The hospital then began focusing on the rehabilitation of patients with spinal cord deterioration caused by disease or trauma, pioneering the interdisciplinary team approach to rehabilitation.

It was also in the 1960s that Dr. William Spencer recruited a number of visionary physicians from several different disciplines who had appointments in numerous academic departments, but spent significant amounts of their clinical and research time at the relatively small building at the rear of the then rapidly enlarging and expanding Texas Medical Center. Dr. Gunyon Harrison, a pediatrician with an interest in cystic fibrosis almost single-handedly cared for the children in Greater Houston area with this disease. Dr. Carlos Vallbona, also a pediatrician, a physiologist, a cardiologist from Barcelona Spain had appointments in numerous departments at Baylor College of Medicine. Dr. Paul Harrington, an orthopedic surgeon, with interest in scoliosis, developed a new approach to this disease using what became known as "Harrington Rods", inserted from the back and straightening the backs of these deformed children. A young ENT specialist, Dr. Bobby Alford was still in his residency, and was to achieve broad fame at Baylor College of Medicine, performed almost all of the bronchoscopies needed for the polio and cystic fibrosis patients.

Academic affiliations
TIRR Memorial Hermann is the primary training site for the Physical Medicine & Rehabilitation residency program at The University of Texas Health Science Center at Houston, McGovern Medical School. From 1996 until 2016, Baylor College of Medicine and The University of Texas Health Science Center at Houston formed the BCM/UTHSCH PM&R Alliance. The alliance was the largest physical medicine and rehabilitation residency training program in the nation.

Research programs
The TIRR Memorial Hermann Research Center is a facility for research into rehabilitative medicine.

Brain Injury Research Center

The Brain Injury and Stroke Program at TIRR Memorial Hermann has been designated a Traumatic Brain Injury Model System for nearly three decades, and was funded as a Rehabilitation and Research Training Center of excellence in TBI for over 20 years.

Spinal Cord Injury and Disability Research Center

The mission of the Spinal Cord Injury and Disability Research Center (SCIDR) is to improve functional recovery, health and quality of life for individuals with spinal cord injury (SCI) and other physical disabilities. SCIDR had been conducting research on SCI long before 1972, when it became among the first inpatient rehabilitation programs to be designated as a Model System of Care by the National Institute for Disability and Rehabilitation Research (NIDRR). SCIDR was the first to conduct 40-year follow-up interviews on those early research participants, and SCIDR continues to follow study participants over time at five-year intervals.

NeuroRecovery Research Center

The NeuroRecovery Research Center (NRRC) forms the umbrella for seven independent laboratories at TIRR Memorial Hermann that collaborate on basic science studies and clinical trials. Research under way at the NRRC is supported by the National Institutes of Health; Memorial Hermann Foundation; Mission Connect, a project of TIRR Foundation; TIRR Memorial Hermann; and McGovern Medical School at UTHealth.

Independent Living Research Utilization

Established in 1977, the Independent Living Research Utilization (ILRU) provides comprehensive resources necessary to achieve an advanced level of independence once a rehabilitation patient is discharged from care. The ILRU program at TIRR Memorial Hermann is a community-focused model led by Lex Frieden, regarded worldwide as one of the leading experts in disability policy, the current chairperson of the board of the National Council on Disability (NCD) and president of Rehabilitation International.

ILRU serves as a comprehensive information resource on the Americans with Disabilities Act (ADA). Housed at ILRU, the ADA Resource Center provides training, technical assistance and informational resources to employers, consumers, architects, businesses, media and disability organizations. ILRU is funded through private foundation grants and grants from numerous public agencies, including the United States Department of Education, the United States Department of Health and Human Services, and the United States Department of Labor.

Notable physicians and professionals
 Lex Frieden – disability policy expert,     disability rights activist, architect of the Americans with Disabilities     Act and director of the Independent Living Research Utilization (ILRU)     program at TIRR Memorial Hermann
 Paul Randall Harrington, M.D. - designer of the Harrington Rod, the first device     for the straightening and immobilization of the spine inside the body
 Gerard E.     Francisco, M.D. – Chief Medical Officer and one of the nation's leading     physicians in the field of brain injury and stroke rehabilitation and     spasticity management

References

Bibliography

1950 establishments in Texas
Hospitals in Houston
Medical research institutes in Texas
Institutions in the Texas Medical Center
Rehabilitation hospitals
Hospitals established in 1950